Bojan Milanović (born November 28, 1961) is a singer from Šid, Serbia.

Biography 
Bojan released his debut album for the Croatian market, Zagrizi me jako, najjace, in 1989. His second album, Zeleo bih, was released in 1993 for PGP-RTS. On this album was Bojan's greatest hit, the song "Katarina." The third album, Uzmi sve sto ljubav dotakne, was published in 1995. The greatest hits from this album are the songs "Jutro", "Ti si moja ciganka", "Prvi put", and "Mi se ljubimo". On this album there is a Roy Orbison song, "Reke ljubavi". Bojana Milanovic's last album, Kraljica, was published in 2000. This album contained the hits "Poljubi me", "Gitaro luda", and "Bila jednom jedna pesma". After the publication of this album Bojan withdrew from public life.

Career

1989–1992 
Bojan Milanovic debuted in 1989 at the MESAM music festival with the song "Ponesi me na krilima". In 1992 he performed the songs "Zeleo bih" and "Ciganka" at the "Songs of the Mediterranean" festival in Budva. At the  "Beogradsko prolece"  festival he won the first prize from the audience and jury for debut of the year for the song "Kad dusa zamire".

1993–1994 
At the "Beogradsko prolece" festival in 1993, Bojan performed the song "Katarina." At the MESAM festival he received an award for Best Lyrics for the song "Dugo ljubav umire". That year, the song "Mi se ljubimo" was declared a hit at the summer festival "Songs of the Mediterranean" in Budva. In 1994he performed the song "Jutro" at the MESAM festival. Bojan appears in the series "Srecni ljudi", where he performed the song "Ne pali svetlo". The song was never released on any of Bojan's albums, but on the album Kraljica the song "Gitaro luda" uses the same melody but has different lyrics. He performed the song "Bice bolje" for the film of the same name. It appears on the albums Uzmi sve sto ljubav dotakne and Kraljica.

Discography 
 Zagrizi me jako, najjace – 1989
 Zeleo bih – 1993
 Uzmi sve sto ljubav dotakne – 1995
 Kraljica – 2000

References 

1961 births
Living people
People from Šid
Serbian pop singers
20th-century Serbian male singers